Noguero is a Spanish surname.

Notable people

Notable people with the surname include:

 José Noguero, French actor of Spanish ancestry
 Lorenzo López Noguero, Spanish anarchist
 Jesús Noguero, Spanish actor
 Manuel Noguero, Spanish actor

References

Surnames of Spanish origin